Geetanjali Tikekar Kharbanda is an Indian television actress known for portraying the role of Aparna in Kasautii Zindagii Kay and Anjali Agnihotri in Iss Pyaar Ko Kya Naam Doon? Ek Baar Phir

Career
Geetanjali started her television career with Jersey No. 10 on SAB TV.
In Tere Liye she played Nilanjana Shekhar Ganguly on Star Plus. She gained popularity for her role of Aparna Anurag Basu in Kasautii Zindagii Kay, for which she also won accolades. She also portrayed Anjali Agnihotri in Iss Pyaar Ko Kya Naam Doon? Ek Baar Phir on StarPlus.

Personal life
She married her co-star Sikandar Kharbanda from Kasautii Zindagii Kay. They dated each other 2 and a half years before marriage. The couple have a son named Shaurya Kharbanda born on 1 December 2008.

Television

Awards

References

External links

Living people
1961 births
Indian soap opera actresses
Indian television actresses
Actresses in Hindi television
Actresses from Mumbai
21st-century Indian actresses